Victor William Venasky (born March 6, 1951) is a Canadian former professional ice hockey player. He played in the National Hockey League with the Los Angeles Kings between 1972 and 1979.

Career 
As a junior, Venasky played on the Port Arthur Marrs who made it to the Memorial Cup finals in 1967. After playing college hockey at the University of Denver, Venasky went on to play 430 games in the National Hockey League with the Los Angeles Kings. He now coaches youth hockey and runs an equipment rental shop in Southern California.

Career statistics

Regular season and playoffs

Awards and honours

References

External links 
 

1951 births
Living people
AHCA Division I men's ice hockey All-Americans
Binghamton Dusters players
Canadian expatriate ice hockey players in Switzerland
Canadian ice hockey centres
Denver Pioneers men's ice hockey players
Fort Worth Texans players
HC Davos players
Ice hockey people from Ontario
Los Angeles Kings draft picks
Los Angeles Kings players
Portland Buckaroos players
Sportspeople from Thunder Bay
Springfield Kings players